Obere Bära  is a river of Baden-Württemberg, Germany. It is a headstream of the Bära.

The Obere Bära originates in the western part of the Swabian Jura directly on the European Watershed, near the albtrauf at the village of Tieringen in Meßstetten.

 Tieringen
 Oberdigisheim
 Unterdigisheim
 Nusplingen

See also
List of rivers of Baden-Württemberg

References

Rivers of Baden-Württemberg
Rivers of Germany